Hakea preissii, commonly known as the needle tree, needle bush and Christmas hakea, is a shrub or tree of the genus Hakea native to Western Australia. The Noongar name for the plant is Tanjinn.

Description
It has branchlets that are moderately to densely appressed-pubescent on new growth, quickly glabrescent, and glaucous in their second year.
It blooms from August to December.

Taxonomy
Hakea preissii was first formally described by the botanist Carl Meissner in 1845 from a specimen collected in a forest near York. The description was published in Johann Georg Christian Lehmann's work Plantae Preissianae. The specific epithet (preissii) honours Ludwig Preiss who collected plant specimens in Western Australia between 1838 and 1842.

Distribution and habitat
Needle tree is endemic to an area in the Pilbara, Wheatbelt, Mid West and Goldfields-Esperance  regions of Western Australia. It has a scattered distribution and is found as far north as Tom Price and south as Gnowangerup. It is found along the west coast and a little farther east than Kalgoorlie. The plant is found on plains and around the margins of salt marshes growing in sand, loam and sandy-clay soils. It sometimes invades semi-arid pastoral land in Western Australia.

Conservation
This species is classified as "not threatened" by the Western Australian Government Department of Parks and Wildlife.

References

preissii
Eudicots of Western Australia
Plants described in 1845
Taxa named by Carl Meissner